General Sir Bruce Meade Hamilton,  (7 December 1857 – 6 July 1936) was a British Army general during the Second Boer War and the First World War.

Early life
Hamilton was born the second son of General Henry Meade Hamilton. His three brothers all became officers in the British Army, including the third son, Hubert Ion Wetherall Hamilton.

Military career
Hamilton was appointed a sub-lieutenant in the West Suffolk Regiment of Yeomanry Cavalry in 1874 and commissioned into the East Yorkshire Regiment in 1877. He served in the Second Anglo-Afghan War in 1880 and the First Boer War in 1881. He became commander of the Niger Coast Protectorate Force in Benin City in 1897.

Hamilton took part in the Second Boer War from 1900 until 1902. He played a key role in the capture of Naauwpoort. During the latter part of the war he was in command of the military columns operating in Eastern Transvaal, and following the announcement of peace on 31 May 1902, he supervised the surrender of arms in that area. In his final despatch from South Africa in June 1902, Lord Kitchener, Commander-in-Chief of the forces during the latter part of the war, described Hamilton as an officer "possessed of qualities of boldness, energy and resolution in no common degree". In the South Africa honours list published on 26 June 1902, Hamilton was appointed a Knight Commander of the Order of the Bath (KCB), and he invested as such by King Edward VII at Buckingham Palace on 24 October 1902.

After his return, Hamilton was appointed General Officer Commanding 3rd Division within 1st Army Corps in 1902, transferring to 2nd Division in 1904. He was appointed General Officer Commanding-in-Chief for Scottish Command in 1909. He was Army Commander of the Home Defence formations First Army and Northern Army during the First World War.

References

|-

|-
 

1857 births
1936 deaths
British Army generals of World War I
East Yorkshire Regiment officers
Knights Commander of the Royal Victorian Order
Knights Grand Cross of the Order of the Bath
Recipients of the Order of the Crown (Italy)
British Army generals
Suffolk Yeomanry officers
British Army personnel of the Second Boer War
British military personnel of the First Boer War
British military personnel of the Second Anglo-Afghan War